RFIC is an abbreviation of radio-frequency integrated circuit. Applications for RFICs include radar and communications, although the term RFIC might be applied to any electrical integrated circuit operating in a frequency range suitable for wireless transmission.

There is considerable interest in RFIC research due to the cost benefit of shifting as much of the wireless transceiver as possible to a single technology, which in turn would allow for a system on a chip solution as opposed to the more common system-on-package.  This interest is bolstered by the pervasiveness of wireless capabilities in electronics.  Current research focuses on integrating the RF power amplifier (PA) with CMOS technology, either by using MOSFETs or SiGe HBTs, on RF CMOS mixed-signal integrated circuit chips.

RFIC-related research conferences 
RFIC is also used to refer to the annual RFIC Symposium, a research conference held as part of Microwave Week, which is headlined by the International Microwave Symposium.  Other peer-reviewed research conferences are listed in the table below.

Publications featuring RFIC research 
 IEEE Journal of Solid-State Circuits
 IEEE Transactions on Microwave Theory and Techniques

See also
 RF module
 Radio-frequency identification

References

__notoc__
Integrated circuits